Fuddruckers (sometimes abbreviated Fudds) is an American fast casual, franchised restaurant chain that specializes in hamburgers. The Fuddruckers concept is to offer large hamburgers in which the meat is ground on-site and buns are baked on the premises. As of 2019, Fuddruckers had 49 company-operated restaurants and 107 franchises across the United States and around the world. The company headquarters is in Houston, Texas. On September 8, 2020, Fuddruckers owner Luby's, Inc. announced they plan to liquidate existing assets, including Fuddruckers' assets, distributing the proceeds to investors after the proposed sale of the chains. On June 21, 2021, Black Titan Franchise Systems announced a deal to acquire Fuddruckers for $18.5 million.

History

Founding and growth
Fuddruckers was founded as Freddie Fuddruckers in 1979 by Philip J. Romano in San Antonio, Texas, at a location converted from an old bank to a restaurant. He started the chain because he thought that "the world needed a better hamburger." The Fuddruckers concept was to offer large hamburgers in which the meat was ground on-site and buns were baked on the premises and hamburgers and other dishes were offered with "lots of fresh sliced tomatoes, onions, lettuce and vats of cheese sauce." In California, Fuddruckers competed at the high end of the fast-food market against chains such as Flakey Jake's, sometimes with head-to-head competitions in places such as Northridge, California. By 1988, there were 150 restaurants in the chain. Romano left the chain in 1988 to form Romano's Macaroni Grill. In an interview, Romano stated that "I just felt I had done all I could for the concept."

Fuddruckers was purchased in November 1998 by Michael Cannon, and later it was purchased by Magic Brands. The restaurant sometimes made controversial decisions; for example, in 2010 it began enforcing a no-weapons policy, which insisted that patrons should not carry "visible pistols" unless they were security officials. Laws in some U.S. states allow people to carry guns visibly in public. Fuddruckers management had been concerned that the presence of armed patrons might deter unarmed ones from visiting, but the move caused controversy among pro-gun advocates who threatened to retaliate with boycotts of Fuddruckers restaurants.

In August 2014, Fuddruckers opened the first of its new stores called Fuddruckers Deluxe in Newport News, Virginia, a full-service sit down restaurant serving traditional and new menu items, with a wait staff, full bar and multiple TVs, although it does not offer different size burgers or a "produce and fixings bar" like its traditional restaurants. As of 2018, the restaurant has been closed.

Bankruptcy and ownership changes
The 2008 financial crisis hit the restaurant industry hard, including Fuddruckers. On April 22, 2010, the parent of Fuddruckers, Austin-based Magic Brands LLC, announced plans to file for Chapter 11 bankruptcy protection. It originally planned to sell most of its assets, including Fuddruckers and the Koo Koo Roo brand eateries, to the Tavistock Group for $40 million. On the same day, the firm announced that 24 Fuddruckers restaurants would be closed, several of them in the metro Washington, D.C. area.

On June 18, 2010, Tavistock was outbid by Luby's for Fuddruckers' assets at auction, with a $61 million winning bid. A second estimate was that the sale amount was for $63.45 million. Luby's acquisition of Fuddruckers and Koo Koo Roo was finalized in 2010. During 2011, there were controversies with previous franchise owners regarding the use of the Fuddruckers brand name.

Luby's closure and dissolution
On June 3, 2020, Luby's Board of Directors announced plans to sell all its operating divisions and assets, including real estate assets. This decision was influenced in part by circumstances surrounding the COVID-19 pandemic. Net proceeds from transactions will benefit Luby's stockholders. The company did not have a definitive timeline for future transactions, but expected to eventually wind down remaining operations.

On September 8, 2020, Luby's further announced it has adopted a plan to liquidate all of its existing assets, as opposed to operating in the current form or merely selling off divisions.

As of September 11, 2020, there were 80 Luby's and Fuddruckers still in operation.

99% of Luby's stockholders voted for dissolution in November 2020.
Luby's planned to close all locations by August 2021.

Sale to affiliate of Nicholas Perkins
On June 17, 2021, Luby's announced that it has entered into an agreement to sell the Fuddruckers franchise business operations to Black Titan Franchise Systems LLC, an affiliate of Nicholas Perkins.  As a result, the remaining Fuddruckers locations have remained open past the previously planned closure date of August 2021.

Menu

The chain offered the Original Fudds Burger in various sizes, from 1/3 pound, to 1/2 pound, to 2/3 pound, to 1 pound. The primary focus is on hamburgers but other options are offered including chicken, fish and exotic burgers (buffalo, elk, ostrich, and wild boar).

In 2006, Foxwood executive sous chef Scott Ferguson and Mark Collins made a burger weighing 29.6 pounds and costing US$250, for the Fuddruckers restaurant in the casino. The burger was 18.5 inches wide and 8 inches tall. At the time, this was the world's largest commercially available burger.

Business

Franchise model
While some Fuddruckers restaurants are company-owned, the majority are owned by individual franchisees.

In 2010, there were 135 franchisee-owned Fuddruckers around the United States. In 2011, Fuddruckers had 200 restaurants throughout North America, of which two-thirds were owned by small business owners and 59 were company-operated locations.  By the end of 2015, Fuddruckers had 188 locations, with 35 outside the US.

Headquarters
The firm has moved its headquarters location several times. Currently, the headquarters is the near northwest district of Houston, Texas. It has been there since the acquisition by Luby's in 2010. From 2005 to 2010, Fuddruckers was headquartered in southwest Austin, Texas; before that, in North Andover, Massachusetts, before that at Cherry Hill Park in Beverly, Massachusetts, before that in One Corporate Place in Danvers, Massachusetts; before that, in Lakeside Office Park in Wakefield, Massachusetts. When it shifted headquarters from the Boston area to Austin in 2005, it spent $1 million and laid off 30 employees to operate more efficiently, according to chief financial officer Matt Pannek. Within six weeks of the move, the company hired 30 new employees for the Austin headquarters. By December 2005 the company planned to move into about 16,000-17,000 square feet (1,500-1,600 m2) of space in an adjacent building and turn one of the original Austin facilities into a training center and test kitchen. Pannek said that the central location of the headquarters allows the company to more easily communicate with its franchisees across the United States.

Locations
Fuddruckers expanded outside of the United States. There were locations in Canada in the mid-1980s, including Saskatoon and Regina, Saskatchewan. Their first Australian store opening in Brisbane's Eagle Street Pier shopping centre in November 1993, followed by another store in the Logan Hyperdome south of Brisbane in August 1994 (which closed in August 1995, having never made a profit), and a store opening at the Macquarie shopping centre at North Ryde in Sydney in September 1994, all operated under franchise by Butcher Baker Goodtimes Maker until late 1996 when the franchisee went bankrupt and Fuddruckers left the country.

Fuddruckers opened their first Middle Eastern location opening in May 1994 in Jeddah, Saudi Arabia by Arabian Food Supplies. Fuddruckers opened restaurants in Argentina in 1988; later, however, sales fell and Fuddruckers left the country. In 2013, Fuddruckers opened its first restaurant in Santo Domingo, Dominican Republic, which later closed. They also opened restaurants in Santiago, Chile and Bogotá, Colombia, all of which have since been closed.

In 2014, Fuddruckers partnered with Italian-based franchisee Vinum et Alia to open 10 restaurants across Italy, Poland, and Switzerland. Their first restaurant opened in Varese (Lombardy). They later added locations in Legnano and Casnate con Bernate, Italy, as well as Warsaw, Poland. However, as of 2019, this franchisee was no longer active and all European locations had been shut down.

As of June 2019, Fuddruckers had 156 locations across the United States and globally. Through their franchise partners, they operate 8 restaurants internationally in 4 countries. One each in Saskatoon and Regina, Saskatchewan, Canada, two in Mérida, Yucatán, Mexico, one in Caguas, Puerto Rico, and three in Panama City, Panama. Additionally, 33 licensed locations are currently operating throughout certain countries in Africa, the Middle East, and parts of Asia. These countries include: Saudi Arabia, Egypt, United Arab Emirates, Qatar, Jordan, Bahrain, and Kuwait.

In popular culture
Fuddruckers was cited in the 2006 American science-fiction comedy film directed by Mike Judge, Idiocracy to show the slow devolution of society as the chain's name changes from the family-friendly "Fuddruckers" to the adult-oriented "buttfuckers".

Goobersmooches restaurant from the animated TV series King of the Hill– also created by Mike Judge – is a parody of Fuddruckers.

The "Are You There God? It's Me, Peter" episode of the animated TV show Family Guy (season 16, episode 20, first broadcast on May 20, 2018) features a long disquisition by Peter Griffin of what Fuddruckers is about, the gist of which is that one goes there to create the wildest possible hamburger with the condiments and toppings offered. Angry that his children don't understand this, Peter puts tableware, a saltshaker, his car keys and a plastic basket on his burger to demonstrate what they should be doing.

The “Call Me Skeeter Juice” episode of Call Me Kat (season 3, episode 2) has Kat eagerly desiring a trip to the (non-existent) Louisville, KY location of Fuddruckers.

See also
 List of hamburger restaurants

References

External links 

 

Companies based in Austin, Texas
Companies that filed for Chapter 11 bankruptcy in 2010
Fast casual restaurants
Fast-food chains of the United States
Hamburger restaurants in the United States
1998 mergers and acquisitions
2010 mergers and acquisitions
Restaurant chains in the United States
Restaurants established in 1979
Restaurants in San Antonio
Tavistock Group
1979 establishments in Texas